Max Poole (born 1 March 2003) is a British cyclist, who currently rides for UCI WorldTeam .

Major results

2019
 1st Coppa d'Oro
2020
 4th Overall La Philippe Gilbert Juniors
 5th Overall Grand Prix Rüebliland
2021
 1st  Overall Tour of Yorkshire Juniors
 2nd Overall La Philippe Gilbert Juniors
1st  Mountains classification
1st Stage 2
 7th Paris–Roubaix Juniors
 9th Road race, UCI Junior Road World Championships
 10th Overall Grand Prix Rüebliland
1st  Points classification
1st Stage 1
2022
 5th Giro del Medio Brenta
 6th Overall Giro della Valle d'Aosta
 7th Overall Arctic Race of Norway
 10th Overall Sazka Tour

References

External links

2003 births
Living people
British male cyclists